Bayt Hanbas is a village in Bani Matar District of Sanaa Governorate, Yemen. It is located above the Qa al-Nahim plain, in the mountains southwest of Sanaa.

History 
According to the 10th-century writer al-Hamdani, Bayt Hanbas is named after one Ḥanbaṣ b. Yuʽfir Dhī Yahar, of the tribe of Himyar. Al-Hamdani described Bayt Hanbas as once having been the site of at least one great palace, which had been destroyed by the Qarmatians in 908 CE (295 AH). No traces of the palace exist today. Later, during the 13th and 14th centuries, Bayt Hanbas served as a minor stronghold of the Banu Shihab tribe.

References 

Villages in Sanaa Governorate